Reotith is a large village in the Gopalganj district of Bihar. It is a well developed village. In the area, the population is huge and by caste mainly found Bhumihar(BABUSHAEB), Brahmins,Teli, Muslim, Nonia, Kurmi.

See also 
 List of villages in India

References 

Villages in Gopalganj district, India